is a former Japanese football player and manager he is the currently assistant manager J1 League club of Avispa Fukuoka.

Playing career
Yoshida was born in Aichi Prefecture on April 13, 1973. After graduating from Doshisha University, he joined J1 League club Verdy Kawasaki in 1996. Although he debuted in 1996, he could hardly play in the match until 1997. In 1998, he moved to Vissel Kobe. He played many matches as left side back in 3 seasons. In 2001, he moved to JEF United Ichihara. He played many matches as left back of three backs defense. However his opportunity to play decreased from 2002. In 2004, he moved to Sanfrecce Hiroshima. He became a regular player as left back of three backs defense. However he could hardly play in the match in 2005. In 2006, he moved to J2 League club Sagan Tosu. He played as mainly center back in 2 seasons. He retired end of 2007 season.

Coaching career
After retirement, Yoshida started coaching career at Sanfrecce Hiroshima in 2008. He coached for youth team in 2008. In 2009, he became a coach for his local university, Chukyo University. In 2010, he signed with Sagan Tosu and became a coach for top team. In August 2014, manager Yoon Jong-hwan was sacked and Yoshida became a new manager as Yoon successor. He managed the club until end of 2014 season and he returned to coach in 2015. In 2016, he moved to FC Gifu and became a coach under manager Ruy Ramos. In July 2016, Ramos was sacked and Yoshida became a new manager as Ramos successor. In 2017, he moved to V-Varen Nagasaki and became a coach.

Club statistics

Managerial statistics

References

External links
 
 

1973 births
Living people
Doshisha University alumni
Association football people from Aichi Prefecture
Japanese footballers
J1 League players
J2 League players
Tokyo Verdy players
Vissel Kobe players
JEF United Chiba players
Sanfrecce Hiroshima players
Sagan Tosu players
Japanese football managers
J1 League managers
J2 League managers
Sagan Tosu managers
FC Gifu managers
Association football defenders